Too Many Thieves is a 1967 American crime film directed by Abner Biberman and starring Peter Falk, Britt Ekland and Joanna Barnes.

The film is a re-edit of two episodes from the 1965 TV series The Trials of O'Brien.

Premise
A gang of criminals steal a priceless Macedonian artifact from a museum.

Cast
 Peter Falk as Danny
 Britt Ekland as Claudia
 Joanna Barnes as Katie
 Nehemiah Persoff as Georgi
 David Carradine as Felix
 George Coulouris as Andrew
 Elaine Stritch as Miss G
 Bill Anderson as David
 Ludwig Donath as Bulanerti
 Pierre Olaf as Petros

See also
List of American films of 1967

References

External links

1967 films
1967 crime films
Films directed by Abner Biberman
American crime films
Metro-Goldwyn-Mayer films
Films edited from television programs
Filmways films
1960s English-language films
1960s American films